Electromagnetic vortex intensifier with ferromagnetic particles (vortex layer device, electromagnetic mill) consists of an operating chamber (pipeline) with a diameter of 60–330 mm, located inside an inductor with a rotating electromagnetic field. The operating chamber contains cylindrical ferromagnetic particles 0.5–5 mm in diameter and 5–60 mm in length, ranging from tens to several thousand pieces (0.05–20 kg), depending on the dimensions of the operating chamber of the intensifier.

History of electromagnetic vortex intensification
Electromagnetic devices with a vortex layer were proposed in 1967 by D.D. Logvinenko and O.P. Shelyakov. The monograph "intensification of technological processes on devices with a vortex layer", written by these authors, showed the effective use of these devices in:
 mixing of liquids and gases
 mixing of loose materials
 dry grinding of solids (micro-resin)
 grinding and dispersion of solids in liquid media
 activation of substance surface
 implementation of chemical reactions
 changes in the physical and chemical properties of substances
Following this research, these intensifiers found their application in many researches and developments.

Physical processes in electromagnetic vortex intensifiers
Intensification of technological processes and chemical reactions is achieved due to intensive mixing and dispersion, acoustic and electromagnetic treatment, high local pressure and electrolysis of processed components. Electromagnetic devices with a vortex layer with ferromagnetic elements accelerate the reactions 1.5-2 times; reduce the consumption of reagents and electricity by 20%. The grinding effect is achieved by the motion of ferromagnetic particles and their free collision with each other, and a constrained collision between the particles and a body. The degree of grinding is 0.5 μm (with an initial size of 20 mm).
At present, the electromagnetic devices with a vortex layer with ferromagnetic elements actually exist (D.D. Logvinenko himself designed and produced more than 2000 pieces), their principle is also implemented in some technological lines.

Industrial application of electromagnetic vortex intensifiers
Examples of industrial applications of these devices for intensifying processes are:
 preparation of food emulsions
 preparation of multicomponent suspensions with vulcanizing and gelling agents (sulfur, zinc oxide, soot, kaolin, sodium silicofluoride) in latex sponge production; Obtaining suspensions of titanium dioxide used as matting agent for chemical fibers
 wastewater treatment from acids, alkalis, hexavalent chromium compounds, nickel, iron, zinc, copper, cadmium, other heavy metals, cyanide compounds, and other contaminants
 production of greases and emulsions
 drilling fluid preparation
 preparation of kerosene in water emulsions, silicone, rubber, latex, etc.
Electromagnetic vortex intensifier grinds and regrinds coal, alumina-containing slag, quartz sand, technical diamonds, cellulose, chalk, wood flour, fluoroplastics, etc.
Also, it can be used for decontamination of agricultural animal waste.

References

Electromagnetic components
Electrochemical engineering
Fluid dynamics
Fluid technology
Ferromagnetism
Drilling fluid
Electrolysis
Chemical reactions